Harvey Howard Flowers (September 11, 1865 – May 8, 1945) was a Minnesota Republican politician and a Speaker of the Minnesota House of Representatives. Flowers served as postmaster for Cleveland, Minnesota and president of the Cleveland State Bank. He was elected to the Minnesota House of Representatives in 1912. He became speaker in 1915, a position he held two years.

References

1865 births
1945 deaths
Republican Party members of the Minnesota House of Representatives
Speakers of the Minnesota House of Representatives
People from Le Sueur County, Minnesota
Businesspeople from Minnesota
Minnesota postmasters